Amata stenoptera is a moth of the family Erebidae. It was described by Zerny in 1912. It is found in Kenya.

References

 Natural History Museum Lepidoptera generic names catalog

Endemic moths of Kenya
stenoptera
Moths described in 1912
Moths of Africa